The Restaurant Group plc  is a British chain of restaurants and public houses. It is listed on the London Stock Exchange.

History
The company was founded by Matthew Brown from Chatteris in 1987 as City Centre Restaurants plc with the objective of owning and managing the Garfunkel's Restaurant chain. In the late 1980s, the company bought the Mexican foodchain Chi Chi's and renamed it Chiquito. Then, in 1995, it opened its first Frankie & Benny's in Leicester.

In January 2004, the company changed its name to The Restaurant Group plc. In February 2004, it made an unsuccessful bid for Ask Central plc, and in 2006, it bought back the Deep Pan Pizza chain, which it had previously sold to the management. In 2016, the company announced it was closing 33 restaurants due to falling sales and profits.

In 2018, The Restaurant Group purchased noodle chain Wagamama for £559m, to diversify its portfolio.

In May 2018, the Brunning & Price division purchased the Ribble Valley Inns, a collection of restaurant and real ale pubs in the north of England, from the Northcote Group for an undisclosed sum; and in August 2018, the division purchased the 11-strong portfolio of Food & Fuel Pubs, which included two Coco Momo wine bars, for £15.4 million.

On 3 June 2020, during the COVID-19 pandemic in the United Kingdom, The Restaurant Group told employees a "large number" of its outlets would not reopen after lockdown; up to 120 restaurants, mainly Frankie & Benny's, were set to close permanently, with the loss of between 2,000 and 3,000 jobs. On 8 June, The Restaurant Group said it was in discussions with its landlords about potential restructuring options, and three days later announced it had entered a company voluntary arrangement (CVA) and planned to cut 125 sites.

In October 2020 the business suffered a significant shareholder revolt over the proposed pay package of its chief executive, Andy Hornby. After a year involving over 4,000 job losses and approximately 230 restaurant closures more than a third of investors opposed the package.

Operations

As of December 2019, The Restaurant Group plc operated over 400 restaurants and pub restaurants throughout the UK. It also operates a multi‐brand Concessions business which trades principally in UK airports. In addition, the Wagamama business had 6 restaurants in the US and over 50 franchise restaurants operating across a number of territories.

Subsidiaries
Brunning & Price
Chiquito
Coast to Coast
Frankie & Benny's
Garfunkel's
Wagamama

See also
 List of companies based in London

References

External links
 
Frankie & Benny's
Chiquito

British companies established in 1987
Companies based in the London Borough of Southwark
Companies listed on the London Stock Exchange
Restaurants established in 1987
Restaurant groups in the United Kingdom